Maria Malicka may refer to:
 Maria Malicka (actress)
 Maria Malicka (chess player)